The 4th edition of Miss Diva took place in 2016. 16 contestants competed in the pageant. Miss Diva 2016 featured a television reality series which was telecast on Colors Infinity. The 16 contestants, who were mentored by former Femina Miss India Universe 2000 and Miss Universe 2000 Lara Dutta through the series, were based in a "Diva Villa" at Madh Island and judged based on their performances by celebrity judges.

At the finale held on September 1, 2016, Roshmitha Harimurthy won the pageant and was crowned Miss Diva India Universe 2016 by the previous winner Urvashi Rautela, Srinidhi Shetty was crowned Miss Diva Supranational 2016 by Natasha Assadi and Stephania Stegman and Aradhana Buragohain was crowned Miss Diva Runner Up 2016 by Naveli Deshmukh. 

Roshmitha Harimurthy represented India at the Miss Universe 2016 pageant held in the Philippines where she is unplaced. Srinidhi Shetty, representing India, was crowned Miss Supranational 2016 on December 2, 2016 in Poland.

Final results
Color keys

Special Awards

Contestants

Crossovers
Femina Miss India
2016: Roshmitha Harimurthy (Top 5)
2016: Aradhana Buragohain (Top 10)

References

External links
 Official site

2016 beauty pageants
Miss Diva
September 2016 events in India